Florent Bessemans (born 2 January 1940) is a Belgian fencer. He competed in the individual foil and épée events at the 1968 Summer Olympics.

References

1940 births
Living people
Belgian male fencers
Belgian épée fencers
Belgian foil fencers
Olympic fencers of Belgium
Fencers at the 1968 Summer Olympics